Rosario (Roy) Paci (born September 16, 1969 in Augusta) is an Italian trumpeter, singer, composer and arranger.

Music and career

Born in Sicily, Paci started playing the piano as a young child and picked up the trumpet at age 10. By 13, he was playing with traditional Sicilian jazz and performing in some of Italy's most famous clubs.

Paci moved to South America in 1990 where he traveled to play cumbia and popular music in Uruguay, Argentina and Brazil. Further trips to the Canary Islands and Senegal helped him to train and develop his musical influences. These travels set Paci on the path that would lead him into a series of collaborations and tours involving music projects, film, television and political causes, including relief efforts in Africa and Amnesty International's campaign against violence on women.

Returning to Italy, Paci entered the alternative rock scene to play with several bands, including Persiana Jones, Qbeta, Mau Mau, Banda Ionica, and ZU. Paci's tastes reflected his broad influences and these bands played musical styles ranging from ska and punk to free jazz and Italian funeral marches.

In 1999 Roy Paci met French-Spanish musician Manu Chao with whom he recorded the critically acclaimed album Próxima Estación: Esperanza. Paci continued to record with Chao and toured extensively with his group Radio Bemba Sound System. In 2001 Paci began a long-standing collaboration with Dutch post-punk band The Ex, touring and recording with their Ex Orkest, a 20-piece band made up of various European improvisors revolving around The Ex's scratchy anarcho-punk anthems. Along with Wolter Wierbos (trombone), Mats Gustafsson and Ken Vandermark (saxophones), Paci has continued to tour with The Ex as a member of Brass Unbound and contributed trumpet tracks for the band's album Catch My Shoe.

In 2002 Paci formed his own band Aretuska and founded the record label Etnagigante in 2003 to produce their second album Tuttapposto, which explored calypso, rocksteady and swing rhythms alongside new arrangements of classic Sicilian folk music. Collaborations continued with Tony Scott, Mike Patton, Gogol Bordello, Shantel and Zap Mama.

In 2006 Paci joined forces with Grammy Award-winning klezmer musician Frank London and Balkan brass band leader Boban Markovic for an album combining Paci's Sicilian tradition with Jewish melodies and Balkan sounds called Trumpet Triumph.

In 2018, Paci entered the Sanremo Music Festival in collaboration with Diodato, entering the song "Adesso" and finishing 8th overall.

Theatre, television and cinema

Roy Paci has worked for the Italian alternative theater scene, putting up the show Poetry and Andalusia, which was performed in Italy's the most prominent avant-garde theaters. Paci's penchant for experimental theater and music mingled in the Trade Almost telepathy, written by Ivano Fossati and subsequently released as audiobooks. Starting in 2005, Roy Paci's group Aretuska served as the house band on popular Italian television shows, making him and his music familiar to the general public. Paci has composed film scores for Italian cinema and several of Paci's songs have been commissioned for film soundtracks, including a version of "Besame Mucho" in Leonardo Pieraccioni's 2003 film Suddenly Paradise.

Discography

Albums by Roy Paci and Aretuska
Baciamo Le Mani (2001)
Tuttapposto  (2003)
Parola D'Onore (2005)
Suonoglobal (2007)
Bestiario Siciliano – Greatest Hits of Roy Paci & Aretuska (2008)
Latinista (2010)
Valelapena(2017)https://www.discogs.com/

Singles
 "Cantu Siciliano" (2002)
 "The Duse" (2002)
 "Besame Mucho" (2003)
 "Yettaboom" (2003)
 "Viva la vida" (2006)
 "What you see is what you get" (2006)
 "Toda Joia toda beleza" (feat. Manu Chao)
 "Giramundo" (2007)
 "Bonjour Bahia" (2010)

Collaborations

With The Ex
Een Rondje Holland (2001)
Catch My Shoe (2010)
Enormous Door (2013)

With Manu Chao
 Próxima Estación: Esperanza (Virgin, 2001)
 Radio Bemba Sound System (live, Virgin, 2002)
 Sibérie m'était contée (Virgin, 2004)
 La Radiolina  (Because/Nacional, 2007)

With Matshie
Flight Song #7
I Am Sad

With Mau Mau
Viva Mamanera
Eldorado
General chaos
Safari Beach

With Negrita
Soy Taranta
Infinite Joy
Move!
Notte Mediterranea
Brother Joe
Giramundo

With other musicians
Quattroemezzo – Brusco
Closet Wonder – Cesare Basile
Conjure – Conjure
Same Wave – Dj Jad
Electro Cabaret – The Fire
Malacabeza – Harpoons
No Doubt – Jaka
Mondo Cane – Mike Patton & Metropole Orchestra*Tacabanda – Pelù
Unidentified – Subsonica
Hard World – Tonino Carotone
Esplosivo (KOB) – Cor Veleno
Mezzogiorno di Fuoco – Caparezza & Sud Sound System
24000 – Dubioza Kolektiv (Happy Machine, 2016)
Adesso - Diodato

References

External links
 Roy Paci at allmusic.com

1969 births
Living people
Musical groups from Sicily
Italian trumpeters
Male trumpeters
Italian film score composers
Italian male film score composers
Nastro d'Argento winners
Sicilian-language singers
21st-century trumpeters
21st-century Italian male musicians